The ZF EcoLife transmission is a 6 speed planetary transmission for medium capacity applications with rapid speed variation, such as city buses and diesel commuter rail, designed by ZF Friedrichshafen. It features boosted operating economy, longer service life, and higher temperature resistance for operation with Euro 5-6 compatible engines, compared to ZF Ecomat. It also boasts an integral retarder, longer operational intervals between oil changes, higher torque capacity, and "Dynamic, topography-dependent drive program selection" among others.

History
The ZF Ecolife has been in manufacturing since 2007, parallel to the ZF Ecomat until 2016.

The difference between Ecolife and Ecomat in structure mainly lies in the design of the planetary gear set - the connection method between the three-wave gear set and other gear sets has changed, so that the clutches at the front end of the planetary gear set are reduced from three to two; The spur gear was changed to a helical gear, which significantly reduced the operating noise.

Classification
The 2 digits after the AP designation indicate how much torque the open channel can withstand (unit is x100 Nm, for example, 6AP14__ = upper limit of torque of 1400Nm)
The 3rd digit after the AP designation indicates the generation, 0 for first generation and 2 for the second generation.
The last digit denotes the mounting position, and can be 0 or 1.

2nd Generation
ZF developed a new generation of EcoLife as a response to increase of engine power density and increasing vehicle speeds.

The ZF Ecolife 2 has different ratings between 1000nm(6AP1020B) and 3000nm(7AP3020S). And the 6th gear's ratio has changed from 0.615 to 0.59 (in on-highway units). This implies that the gear ratios on the 2nd generation have a slight difference from the original EcoLife.

Gear Ratios
ZF Ecolife 1 

ZF Ecolife 2

ZF Ecolife Off-Road

1st generation variants — EcoLife (2008-2019)
6AP1000B/C - Max Input Torque: 
6AP1200B/C - Max Input Torque: 
6AP1400B/C - Max Input Torque: 
6AP1600BS - Max Input Torque: 
6AP1700B/C - Max Input Torque: 
6AP1900 SP - Max Input Torque: 
6AP2000B/C - Max Input Torque: 
6AP2100B/C - Max Input Torque: 
6AP2300B - Max Input Torque: 
7AP2600 - Max Input Torque:

2nd generation variants — EcoLife 2 (2019-)
6AP1020B - Max Input Torque: 
6AP1220B - Max Input Torque: 
6AP1420B - Max Input Torque: 
6AP1620B/S - Max Input Torque: 
6AP1720B - Max Input Torque: 
6AP2020B - Max Input Torque: 
6AP2120B - Max Input Torque: 
6AP2320B/S - Max Input Torque: 
6AP2520B - Max Input Torque: 
6AP2820B - Max Input Torque: 
7AP3020S - Max Input Torque:

See also
List of ZF transmissions

References

EcoLife
Automobile transmissions